Andries Vosloo Hospital is a Provincial government funded hospital for the Blue Crane Route Local Municipality area in Somerset East, Eastern Cape in South Africa.

The hospital departments include Emergency department, Paediatric ward, Maternity ward, Surgical Services, Medical Services, Operating Theatre & CSSD Services, Pharmacy, Anti-Retroviral (ARV) treatment for HIV/AIDS, Post Trauma Counseling Services, X-ray Services, Physiotherapy, NHLS Laboratory, Oral Health Care Provides, Physiotherapy, Laundry Services, Kitchen Services and Mortuary.

References
Andries Vosloo Hospital

Hospitals in the Eastern Cape
Sarah Baartman District Municipality